Ken and Jonathan is an Australian daytime television series which aired in 1964. Featuring Ken Delo and Jonathan Daly, it was a game show which aired on the Seven Network. The series featured two segments, Who Do You Trust? and Name that Tune. Their prime-time variety series, The Delo and Daly Show continued its run while the daytime series aired. The series aired in a 60-minute time-slot.

References

External links
 

1964 Australian television series debuts
1964 Australian television series endings
Black-and-white Australian television shows
English-language television shows
1960s Australian game shows
Seven Network original programming